Ignis Asset Management was an asset management company with head offices in Glasgow and London. In July 2014, Standard Life Investments (Holdings) Limited acquired Ignis, formerly Resolution Asset Management, for £390m.

Ignis, which is the Latin word for fire or spark, merged with Axial Investment Management in November 2008.

Ignis' former parent company, The Pearl Group, changed its name to The Phoenix Group in 2010.

In 2011 Ignis introduced a business unit structure covering six areas: Fixed Income, Equities, Real Estate, Advisors (a specialist alternatives fund of funds team), Solutions (Liability Driven Investment, asset liability management and related risk mitigation) and Partners (fund management businesses operating in partnership with Ignis).

References

External links 
 Standard Life Investments website
 UK Commercial Property Trust website

Financial services companies of the United Kingdom
Scottish brands